WYAM (890 AM, "Fiesta Mexicana 890") is a Spanish language Variety formatted radio station licensed to serve Hartselle, Alabama. The station primarily serves the Huntsville, Alabama, area.  It is owned by Decatur Communications Properties, LLC.

Due to FCC regulations, the station must sign-off at sunset, to protect Chicago's WLS. The WYAM transmitter is located about 1 mile south of the Tennessee River adjacent to I-65.

Programming
The station is one of three in the area that broadcast in Spanish.  The others are WKAC (1080 AM) in Athens (which broadcasts part-time in English) and WJHX (620 AM) in Lexington.

The station is also an affiliate of the American Family Radio network.

WYAM carried limited OSRN programming, and is a former affiliate of the now-defunct Outdoor Sports Radio Network.

WYAM also has a television department, WYAM TV51, which airs live programming and satellite programming from around the country, offers video editing services, and ad buys for commercials advertising.

History
The station has previously aired Gospel music and Oldies formats.  Until June 1, 1994, the station's call sign was WHRT.

Another station in the Huntsville market, WTAK-FM, was assigned the WYAM call letters from November 15, 1991 until July 6, 1993.

Ownership
In September 1999, WYAM was sold to Priority Communications LLC (Danis L. Willingham and James D. Early, members) by WAJF Inc. (d/b/a Grass Roots American Inc.) for a reported sale price of $75,000. In September 2003, Priority Communications consummated its transfer of the WYAM license to Decatur Communications Properties LLC, the station's current owner.

References

External links
 WYAM TV51

YAM
YAM
Radio stations established in 1956
Morgan County, Alabama
1956 establishments in Alabama
YAM